The GO 52 class is a series of three floating dry docks of the Marina Militare.

Ships

References

External links
 Ships Marina Militare website

Ships built in Italy
Drydocks
Auxiliary ships of the Italian Navy
Floating drydocks